The white-browed tit-spinetail (Leptasthenura xenothorax) is a species of bird in the family Furnariidae. It is endemic to Peru.

Its natural habitat is subtropical or tropical moist montane forest. It is threatened by habitat loss.

References

External links
BirdLife Species Factsheet.

white-browed tit-spinetail
Birds of the Peruvian Andes
Endemic birds of Peru
white-browed tit-spinetail
Taxonomy articles created by Polbot